Churchill is a suburb of Ipswich in the City of Ipswich, Queensland, Australia.

Geography
The western boundary is marked by the Bremer River, while the eastern boundary follows Deebing Creek.

History 
Residents in the Fassifern Valley petitioned the Queensland Government to build a railway line to their district, and the first section of the Dugandan railway line was opened on 10 July 1882 as far as Harrisville. This is considered to be Queensland's first branch railway. Churchill was served by the Churchill railway station at Lobb Street. The branch was extended to Dugandan on 12 September 1887. The line from Churchill to Dugandan closed in 1964 with the remaining line being known as the Churchill branch railway.

In 1913 a Baptist Church opened in Churchill. A stump-capping ceremony was held on Saturday 28 March 1913. On Saturday 9 August 1913, volunteers erected the church in four-and-a-quarter hours using the rapid building technique (with prefabricated parts). The work commenced at 2pm and was finished at 6:15pm for the official opening.

Churchill State School opened on 29 January 1923.

Education 
Churchill State School is a government primary (Prep-6) school for boys and girls at Warwick Road. In 2017, the school had an enrolment of 376 students with 29 teachers (24 full-time equivalent) and 22 non-teaching staff (14 full-time equivalent). It includes a special education program.

There are no secondary schools in Churchill. The nearest secondary school is Bremer State High School in the neighbouring suburb of Ipswich.

References

External links
 

Suburbs of Ipswich, Queensland